is a drama that aired on Fuji TV. It first aired in Japan from April 16, 1997 to June 25, 1997 every Wednesday. It features music by Bryan Ferry (main theme song) and Howard Jones (ending theme song).
It raised several issues in Japanese society, due to its casual use of a butterfly knife and its resulting violence.

Cast
Takuya Kimura as Hayasaka Yukio/Mizoguchi Takehiro 
Shigeru Muroi as Koshigoe Naomi 
Mitsuko Baisho as Inspector Sakuhara 
Masayuki Imai as Norasanei 
Satomi Kobayashi as Hoshikawa Juliet 
Ryoko Shinohara as Akiyama Chiaki 
Kaori Momoi as Dr. Ika
Tsuyoshi Kusanagi as cameo (ep 7)

External links
SMAP WONDERLAND - Gift
Cho Kakkoii Extensive plot for each episode

Japanese drama television series
Television shows written by Yumiko Inoue